Jonas Miliauskas is a Lithuanian sport shooter. 

In 1939 he won silver at 25 m rapid fire pistol individual and team events.

References 
ISSF Profile

Lithuanian male sport shooters
Place of birth missing
Year of birth missing